Ishrat Masroor Quddusi is a Retired Odisha High Court Judge .Earlier he was judge in the Allahabad High Court and Chhattisgarh High Court.He was arrested by the CBI on charges of  attempting to help an Uttar Pradesh based Prasad Education Trust, educational trust barred from admitting students by the Government and Medical council of India.

References

Judges of the Allahabad High Court
Judges of the Andhra Pradesh High Court
Judges of the Chhattisgarh High Court